The 2015 NCAA Division I men's soccer championship game was the final game of the 2015 NCAA Division I Men's Soccer Championship, determining the national champion for the 2015 NCAA Division I men's soccer season. The match was played at Children's Mercy Park in Kansas City, Kansas, a soccer-specific stadium that is home to Major League Soccer club, Sporting Kansas City. The match was between two-seeded Clemson, and eighth-seeded Stanford.
Stanford won the match 4-0.

Venue

Match details

See also 
2015 NCAA Division I Men's Soccer Championship
2015 NCAA Division I men's soccer season

References

2015 NCAA Division I men's soccer season
NCAA Division I Men's Soccer Championship Games
NCAA
NCAA Division I Men's Soccer
Stanford Cardinal men's soccer
Clemson Tigers men's soccer
Soccer in Kansas
Sports in Kansas City, Kansas
NCAA Division I men's soccer championship game